This is an incomplete list of statutory codes from the U.S. states, territories, and the one federal district.

Most states use a single official code divided into numbered titles. Pennsylvania's official codification is still in progress.

California, New York, and Texas use separate subject-specific codes (or in New York's case, "Consolidated Laws") which must be separately cited by name. Louisiana has both five subject-specific codes and a set of Revised Statutes divided into numbered titles.  The Maryland Code was formerly divided into numbered titles, but was recodified into subject-specific articles which must be cited by name.

See also

United States Code, the codified statutes of the United States government
Code of Federal Regulations, the codified regulations of the United States government

References

Statutory codes